Carex seposita is a tussock-forming species of perennial sedge in the family Cyperaceae. It is native to seasonally dry tropical parts of India.

See also
List of Carex species

References

seposita
Plants described in 1908
Taxa named by Charles Baron Clarke
Flora of India